Ryan John Shane (born April 15, 1994) is an American professional tennis player. He played college tennis at the University of Virginia. On May 25, 2015, Shane won the NCAA Men's Singles Championship. This victory also earned him a wild card into the main draw of the 2015 US Open.

Early life
Ryan's parents are Alaine and Jack Shane. He has an older brother, Justin, who also played on the Virginia tennis team, and a younger brother named Zachary. In the summer months growing up Ryan’s family would vacation to Franklin, New Hampshire; where there was a family tennis court that got good use from the Shane brothers. Ryan was part of a Fairfax, Virginia tennis club that also included future Virginia tennis players, Michael Shabaz and Treat Huey. Shane attended J. E. B. Stuart High School in Falls Church, Virginia and was a blue-chip recruit coming out of high school.

College career
As a freshman, Shane was on a Virginia team that went undefeated and won the NCAA Championship. The championship was the first for both Virginia as well the ACC.

Following his sophomore season, Shane was named second-team All-ACC. He was also announced as the ITA Atlantic Region Player to Watch.

During his junior year, Shane helped lead Virginia to an NCAA Championship in the team tournament, playing at #1 singles and doubles. Six days later, Shane defeated Noah Rubin 3–6, 7–6 (7–4), 6–1, to capture the NCAA Men's Singles title. He is the second Virginia player to win the singles tournament, after Somdev Devvarman did so in 2007 and 2008. Shane was named first-team All-ACC following a season where he posted a 27–8 record in singles.

ATP Challenger and ITF Futures finals

Singles: 7 (4–3)

Doubles: 4 (3–1)

References

External links

Virginia Cavaliers bio

1994 births
Living people
American male tennis players
Virginia Cavaliers men's tennis players
Tennis people from Virginia